Banu ( bânu), also spelled Bano, is a Persian name for girls popular in Iran and other Persian-speaking countries. It is also used in Turkey, Pakistan Bangladesh, Azerbaijan, India and Sri Lanka. It means "grand lady" and "princess" in Persian. 

A very different word "Bhanu", meaning "Sun" in Sanskrit. The word is often simplified to "Banu" in certain pronunciations of the word in several Indian languages, notably in Tamil and Telugu.

Notable people with the name Banu or Bano include the following:

Given name
Banu Alkan (born 1958), Turkish-Croatian female actor
Banu Avar (born 1955), Turkish author, journalist, news anchor, and political commentator
Banu Bargu, professor of History of Consciousness and Political Theory at the University of California, Santa Cruz
Aram Banu Begum (1584–1624), Mughal princess, the youngest daughter of Emperor Akbar from his wife Bibi Daulat Shad
Arjumand Banu Begum, Mughal Empress, the chief consort of Mughal Emperor Shah Jahan
Bahar Banu Begum (8206–1653), (meaning "The Blooming Lady"), Mughal princess, the daughter of Mughal emperor Jahangir
Bakshi Banu Begum (born 1540), Mughal princess, the second daughter of Emperor Humayun from his wife Gunwar Bibi
Dilras Banu Begum (1622–1657), the first wife and chief consort of Mughal Emperor Aurangzeb
Hamida Banu Begum (1527–1604), wife of the second Mughal emperor Humayun and the mother of his successor
Hoshmand Banu Begum (born 1605), (meaning "The Prudent Lady"), Mughal princess, the daughter of Prince Khusrau Mirza
Jahanzeb Banu Begum (died 1705), Mughal princess and the chief consort of Muhammad Azam Shah
Nadira Banu Begum (1618–1659), Mughal princess and the wife of Crown prince Dara Shukoh
Parhez Banu Begum (1611–1675), Mughal princess, the first child and eldest daughter of Mughal emperor Shah Jahan from his first wife
Rahmat Banu Begum (born 1656), the first wife of titular Mughal Emperor Muhammad Azam Shah
Sakina Banu Begum (died 1604), Mughal princess, the daughter of Mughal emperor Humayun
Saliha Banu Begum (died 1620), Empress consort of the Mughal Empire as the wife of Emperor Jahangir
Shahar Banu Begum (1663 – ?), Empress consort of the Mughal Empire as the third (and last) wife of Emperor Muhammad Azam Shah
Banu Cennetoğlu, visual artist based in Istanbul
Banu Güven (born 1969), Turkish journalist
Husna Banu Khanam (1922–2006), Bangladeshi educationist, writer and Nazrul singer
Banu Onaral, Professor of Biomedical Engineering and Electrical Engineering at Drexel University, Philadelphia, Pennsylvania
Raihan Akhter Banu Roni (born 1952), ex Member of Parliament of Bangladesh, leader of Bangladesh Nationalist Party(BNP)
Hamida Banu Shova, the founder and chairperson of Queens University, Bangladesh
Banu Subramaniam (born 1966), professor of women, gender and sexuality studies at the University of Massachusetts, Amherst
Meriç Banu Yenal (born 1988), Turkish female basketball player
Banu Parlak, Turkish pop singer
 Banu Chichek, character in the Book of Dede Korkut
 Bano Khalil Ahmed (born 1969), Pakistani politician
 Bano Haralu, Indian journalist and a conservationist
 Bano Qudsia (1928–2017), also known as Bano Aapa, Pakistani novelist, playwright and spiritualist
 Bano Traoré (born 1985), Malian athlete

Surname
Constantin Banu (1873–1940), Romanian writer, journalist, Arts and Religious Affairs Minister in 1922–1923
Farhat Banu, member of the Dhaka Nawab family and member of the Bengal Legislative Assembly in British India
Florentin Banu, businessman from Timișoara
Gheorghe Banu (1889–1957), Romanian hygienist, Health Minister in the Octavian Goga government from December 1937 to March 1938
Grace Banu, Dalit and transgender activist
Gulzar Banu (born 1963), Indian politician and former Mayor of the Mangalore City Corporation, India
Ibn Banu, nominal governor of al-Bahrain for the Abbasid dynasty, serving there in 903
Iksaka Banu (born 1964), Indonesian writer of comics and prose
Leila Arjumand Banu (1929–1995), Bangladeshi singer and social activist
Naseem Banu (1916–2002), Indian film actress
Rahima Banu (born 1972), the last known person to have been infected with naturally occurring Variola major smallpox
Saira Banu (born 1943), Indian film actress and the wife of the film actor Dilip Kumar
Sayeda Motahera Banu, Bangladesh writer and winner of the Independence Day Award in 2001, the highest civilian award in Bangladesh
Selina Banu, Bangladeshi politician, social activist, and feminist
Tharika Banu, the first registered transgender person to complete her secondary education in Tamil Nadu
Arsénio Bano (born 1974), East Timorese politician
Fatima Bano, Indian wrestling coach
Franco Bano (born 1986), Argentinian footballer
Ilir Bano, Albanian politician
Iqbal Bano (1935–2009), Pakistani Ghazal singer
Jeelani Bano (born 1936), Indian Urdu writer
Khursheed Bano (1914–2001), Pakistani singer and actress
Noor Bano (politician), Indian politician
Saira Bano (born 1944), Indian actress
Shah Bano (born c. 1916), Indian feminist
Shamim Bano (1941–1984), Indian Pashtun actress

Arts and entertainment 

 Bano (novel), by Pakistani novelist Razia Butt

See also
Bano (disambiguation)
Banu (disambiguation)
Bangu (disambiguation)
Begum
Khatun
Shahbanu

Iranian feminine given names
Turkish feminine given names
Persian words and phrases
Pakistani feminine given names
Bangladeshi feminine given names

br:Banu